Matt Hazard: Blood Bath and Beyond is a downloadable video game for the PlayStation Network and Xbox Live Arcade. It is a sequel to Eat Lead: The Return of Matt Hazard.

Plot

Matt Hazard, the protagonist from the previous game, goes back in time and revisits his earlier games to prevent an evil corporation called Marathon MegaCorp from destroying him.

Gameplay

Unlike its predecessor which was a 3D third person shooter, this game is a 2D side-scroller in order to evoke the feel of a retro game, however, the game developers make use of 3D graphics. The player has the ability to use upgraded weapons with limited ammo. Players also are able to use shoulder buttons to enter precision aim mode. Levels contain boxes allowing the player to power up. The game features three difficulty modes: Wussy, Damn This is Hard, and Fuck This Shit, the most difficult mode, in which enemies are able to kill players in just one hit. The game also contains a two player co-op mode, in which the second player controls Hazard's partner Dexter Dare. Weapons available to the player include flamethrowers, shotguns, grenades, plasma rifles and ice guns. The player is also able to deflect missiles the enemy fires at them by shooting at them. The game also features a large amount of graphic violence, unlike its predecessor.

Reception
On Metacritic it has a score of 65.

References

2010 video games
D3 Publisher games
PlayStation 3 games
PlayStation Network games
Video game sequels
Video games developed in the United States
Xbox 360 Live Arcade games
Video games scored by Rod Abernethy
Video games with 2.5D graphics